Phaonia siebecki is a species of fly which is distributed across parts the Palaearctic.

References

Muscidae
Diptera of Europe
Insects described in 1911
Taxa named by Johann Andreas Schnabl